George Truman (6 December 1886 – 17 June 1955) was an Australian cricketer. He played one first-class cricket match for Victoria in 1919.

See also
 List of Victoria first-class cricketers

References

External links
 

1886 births
1955 deaths
Australian cricketers
Victoria cricketers
Cricketers from Melbourne